Starksia rava, the tawny blenny, is a species of labrisomid blenny endemic to the waters around the island of Tobago. This species can reach a length of  SL.

References

rava
Fish described in 2003